Henrietta (Henriette) Alice McCrea-Metcalf (August 4, 1888 – May 27, 1981) was an American born, French raised translator; she was one of the partners of Thelma Wood and was immortalized by Djuna Barnes in Nightwood.

Biography
Henrietta Alice McCrea was born on August 4, 1888 into a wealthy Chicago family at 764 West Adams Street. Her father was Wylie (Willis) Solon McCrea,  a public utilities executive and member of the Board of Trade. Her mother was Alice E. Snell, the daughter of A.J. Snell. She had one brother, Snell McCrea. When she was few months old, her mother filed for divorce, accusing her husband of cruelty, and moved with her daughter to Paris.

McCrea was at first attended a Catholic convent in Paris, and then, when she was 10 years old, at her mother's death, her father took her back to Chicago where she attended other public schools. Later she attended Mlle. Bouligny's School in Chevy Chase, Maryland. By 1906 she had returned to Europe to attend a girls' school. In Paris she became friends with actress Jane Peyton and her husband Guy Bates Post. By the end of 1910 she was back in Chicago, living at 720 Lincoln Park Boulevard.

McCrea married and divorced twice. First, in 1911, to Willard Metcalf, a landscape painter, with whom she had two children, Addison McCrea Metcalf and Rosalind (who married Frederick Harris). Second to Marcus Goodrich, American screenwriter and novelist. Before marrying Metcalf, McCrea was in a sentimental relationship with Ned Sheldon, a leading Broadway's playwright. In 1952, she became the guardian of Jacobus Arnoldus .

A fan of theater and actors her collection of autographed photographs and other memorabilia is at the University of Kentucky. She was the dramatic editor for Vanity Fair. Metcalf was a translator from French into English, among her works: Alexandre Dumas' Camille and Anatole France's Our Lady's Juggler. She was a friend of Colette and translated La Dame aux Camélias in 1931 for Eva Le Gallienne and her Civic Repertory Theater.

In 1926 she was the executive secretary of the Education Committee of the Roosevelt Memorial Association for Women.

McCrea met Thelma Wood in 1928, when the latter was still in a relationship with Djuna Barnes. Wood left Barnes to live with McCrea. In Nightwood by Barnes, modeled the character Jenny Petherbridge on McCrea. The relationship was acknowledged by McCrea's family to the point that her son, Addison Metcalf, included references to Wood in letters to his mother. McCrea and Wood moved first to Greenwich Village and then in 1932 to Florence, where Wood studied art supported by McCrea. In 1934 they moved to Sandy Hook, Connecticut, where Wood launched a gourmet catering service, always supported by McCrea's money. McCrea remained with Wood until 1943 and the relationship ended in a bad way, so much that McCrea rejected the death bed request of Wood to see her. In the 1950s McCrea lived at 86 1/2 Main Street, Newtown. She was member of the Board of Directors for the Planned Parenthood League of Connecticut. In the 1970s McCrea let people farm four acres of her land in a project to have young people work together with their fathers in a rewarding activity.

She was interested in animal welfare and was an activist of Pet Animal Welfare Service (PAWS), Friends of Animals and Humane Society. With other activists she opened "Ye Kit and Kaboodle" at 7 Liberty Street, Bridgeport, CT; the proceedings from the selling of antiques, clothing and paintings, displayed in a colonial-motif, were to go to the care of stray animals in the area.

McCrea-Metcalf died on May 27, 1981.

Legacy
Addison Metcalf founded The Henrietta Alice Metcalf Memorial Scholarship at The American Academy of Dramatic Arts to honor his mother love of the theater.

The Henrietta Alice Metcalf Performing Arts Photographic Collection, dated from 1880 to 1955, is hosted at the University of Kentucky Libraries Special Collections Research Center.

References

External links
 portrait with Helen Ware and Josephine Victor (Wayback)

1888 births
1981 deaths
American socialites
20th-century American women writers
20th-century American philanthropists
People from Chicago
20th-century American translators